Turnure is a surname. Notable people with the surname include:

Arthur Baldwin Turnure (1856–1906), American businessman
Pamela Turnure (born 1937), American press secretary
Tom Turnure (born 1957), American football player